Khaleqabad (also Romanized as Khāleqābād; also known as Khalikabad) is a village in Khararud Rural District, in the Central District of Khodabandeh County, Zanjan Province, Iran. At the 2006 census, its population was 980, in 183 families.

References 

Populated places in Khodabandeh County